Avalon North Station is a 38-story,  residential skyscraper in Boston, Massachusetts, United States. The high-rise is built adjacent to the North Station transportation hub. The property contains 503 studio, one, two, and three-bedroom apartments.

See also

List of tallest buildings in Boston

References

External links

Towers in Massachusetts
West End, Boston